Cheyyar is a neighbourhood in Tiruvannamalai, Tamil Nadu, India.

Cheyyar may also refer to:
 Cheyyar town
 Cheyyar block
 Cheyyar taluk 
 Cheyyar (state assembly constituency) 
 Cheyyar division
 Cheyyar River